Pratifelis is an extinct genus of feline that lived in North America during the middle Miocene period. It contains a single species, Pratifelis martini.

Etymology
The generic name Pratifelis comes from the Latin words pratum meaning field or plain, and felis, meaning cat. The specific name martini was given in honor of a Mr. Martin who originally collected the fossils.

Taxonomy
In the summer of 1911, the first and only specimen was collected by H. T. Martin in Wallace County, Kansas. It was transported to the University of Kansas Museum of Vertebrate Paleontology, where it was named and described by paleontologist Claude W. Hibbard as a new genus and species of feline in 1934.

In a 1954 paper J. R. Macdonald reassigned the species to the genus Pseudaelurus, but later papers maintained its status as a distinct and valid genus.

A 2003 paper by Tom Rothwell, who had seen casts of the specimen, mentioned in passing that it had some similarity to specimens of Nimravides, and that an examination of the original specimen might result in a reassignment to that genus.

Description
The single specimen upon which both the genus and species were based, UKMNH 3156, is a partial lower left ramus with only the third and fourth premolars and the first molar present. It has been noted for having fairly heavy dentition considering how light its jaw was.

P. martini was a short-faced cat, likely bigger than the modern cougar.

References

Prehistoric mammals of North America
Miocene felids
Prehistoric felines
Prehistoric carnivoran genera